McGlinchey is an Irish surname. Notable people with the surname include:
 Bernard McGlinchey (1932–2013), Irish businessman and politician
 Brian McGlinchey (born 1977), retired Northern Irish football defender
 Cameron McGlinchey, the former drummer of popular Australian band Rogue Traders
 Conner McGlinchey, Australian footballer
 Dominic McGlinchey (1954–1994), Irish republican paramilitary with the Irish National Liberation Army (INLA)
 Herbert J. McGlinchey (1904–1992), Democratic member of the U.S. House of Representatives and the Pennsylvania Senate
 Michael McGlinchey (born 1987), footballer currently playing for Wellington Phoenix
 Mike McGlinchey (American football coach) (1944–1997), Central Connecticut State University Blue Devils and Frostburg State University Bobcats
 Mike McGlinchey (offensive lineman) (born ), for the Notre Dame Fighting Irish
 Marian Price (born 1954), née Marion McGlinchey, Irish republican

See also
McGlinchey Stafford, United States-based law firm focusing on corporate defense litigation with offices in eight cities in five states
McGlinchy

Anglicised Irish-language surnames